The 1902 Iowa State Cyclones football team represented Iowa State College of Agricultural and Mechanic Arts (later renamed Iowa State University) as an independent during the 1902 college football season. In their first season under head coach A. W. Ristine, the Cyclones compiled a 6–3–1 record, shut out six of ten opponents, and outscored all opponents by a combined total of 246 to 56. Fred Byl was the team captain.

Between 1892 and 1913, the football team played on a field that later became the site of the university's Parks Library. The field was known as State Field; when the new field opened in 1914, it became known as "New State Field".

Schedule

References

Iowa State
Iowa State Cyclones football seasons
Iowa State Cyclones football